Wonnangatta is a locality in north east Victoria, Australia.
 

Wonnangatta Station was the site of the Wonnangatta murders in 1917.

References

External links

Towns in Victoria (Australia)
Alpine Shire